Halcinonide is a high potency corticosteroid, in group II (second most potent group) under US classification. It is used topically (in a 0.05% cream provided as Halog) in the treatment of certain skin conditions.

References

Acetonides
Secondary alcohols
Chloroarenes
Corticosteroid cyclic ketals
Corticosteroids
Diketones
Fluoroarenes
Glucocorticoids